Yemişanlı is a municipality and village in the Oghuz Rayon of Azerbaijan. It has a population of 485.

References

Populated places in Oghuz District